Musa Bolaghi (also Romanized as Mūsá Bolāghī; also known as Mūsá Khān Bolāqī (Persian: موسي خان بلاقي), Mūsa Khān Balaghi, Mūsá Khān Bolāghī, and Mūsá Khān-e Bolāgh) is a village in Tork-e Sharqi Rural District, Jowkar District, Malayer County, Hamadan Province, Iran. At the 2006 census, its population was 454, in 98 families.

References 

Populated places in Malayer County